Lawrence Simpson (August 13, 1890 – June 25, 1921) was a Negro leagues pitcher for several years before the founding of the first Negro National League. He pitched for the West Baden Sprudels, the Indianapolis ABCs, and the Chicago Union Giants.

Simpson attended Wilberforce University in Wilberforce, Ohio.

He died in 1921 and is buried in Lincoln Cemetery in Blue Island, Illinois.

References

External links
  and Seamheads

Indianapolis ABCs players
1890 births
1921 deaths
20th-century African-American sportspeople